Gustaf Nils Jansson (5 January 1922 – 11 April 2012) was a Swedish long-distance runner who won the bronze medal in the marathon at the 1952 Summer Olympics. He finished fifth at the 1954 European Athletics Championships.

References 

1922 births
2012 deaths
People from Filipstad Municipality
Swedish male long-distance runners
Swedish male marathon runners
Olympic athletes of Sweden
Olympic bronze medalists for Sweden
Athletes (track and field) at the 1952 Summer Olympics
Medalists at the 1952 Summer Olympics
Olympic bronze medalists in athletics (track and field)
Sportspeople from Värmland County
20th-century Swedish people